The 2012 Virginia Cavaliers football team represented the University of Virginia in the 2012 NCAA Division I FBS football season. The Cavaliers were led by third year head coach Mike London and played their home games at Scott Stadium. They were members of the Coastal Division of the Atlantic Coast Conference. The team started out 2-0 for the second consecutive season after victories over Richmond and Penn State. The Cavaliers then proceeded to lose six straight games, their longest losing streak since 2009. The team bounced back with impressive victories over NC State and Miami, and then were eliminated from bowl eligibility when North Carolina handed them their seventh loss. The Cavaliers ended the season with a close loss to rival Virginia Tech and finished 4–8.

Previous season
The Cavaliers went 8–5 in 2011, their first winning season under head coach Mike London. The Cavaliers followed a slow 3–2 start with a 5–2 finish that saw the team win against Florida State in Doak Campbell Stadium in November, and halt a three-year skid against Duke.  The Cavaliers could not end their drought against Virginia Tech, but finished second in the ACC Coastal Division and third in the ACC overall.  They were selected to represent the ACC in the Chick-fil-A Bowl against Auburn.

Personnel

Coaching staff

Schedule

Depth chart
Depth Chart release before October 6, 2012 Duke game.

References

Virginia
Virginia Cavaliers football seasons
Virginia Cavaliers football